Robert Shafer may refer to:

 Robert L. Shafer (born 1932), American lawyer, lobbyist, and diplomat
 Robert Shafer (conductor) (born 1946), American conductor and classical composer
 Robert R. Shafer (born 1958), American actor